Erasakkanayakkanur is a small village located near Theni, Tamil Nadu state, India. 

Villages in Theni district
Palayam